Nadine White (born 22 October 1992) is a British journalist. In March 2021 she joined The Independent as the first dedicated race correspondent in UK journalism.

Early life and education

White was born in Brixton, London, to Jamaican parents from Trelawny Parish and Clarendon Parish. She has two brothers. She attended south London schools before graduating from University College London, where she studied English Literature. She subsequently did NCTJ training at News Associates, London.

Career

She worked as a journalist for The Voice newspaper, the Weekly Gleaner UK, and for the HuffPost between 2018 and 2021, leading coverage around race, before joining The Independent as that newspaper's Race Correspondent.

In January 2021, White was accused on Twitter by UK government equalities minister Kemi Badenoch of undermining trust in the COVID-19 vaccination programme, charges that White denied. The accusations came after White sent emails to Badenoch's press office as part of her research for a story.

Recognition and awards
White's work has been shortlisted for awards including, in 2018, the Hugh Cudlipp Student Journalism Prize, and an Amnesty Media Award. She was also the first black reporter to be shortlisted for the Paul Foot Award, together with Emma Youle for their SPAC Nation Expose.

In 2020, she won a Mischief + MHP 30 To Watch: Young Journalist Awards, and also in 2020 won the inaugural Paulette Wilson Windrush Award, from the Windrush Caribbean Film Festival.

In April 2021, White was included by Forbes magazine on their annual 30 Under 30 list of "young visionary leaders brashly reinventing business and society". In October 2021, she was named on BBC Radio 1Xtra Future Figures list as one of 29 individuals, groups, and organisations from across the United Kingdom who are "Making Black History Now".

In November 2021, White was appointed as a Visiting Industry Fellow at Birmingham City University.

References

External links
 Nadine White, Race Correspondent @nadine_writes, The Independent.
 Nadine White, "What is it like to be a young, Black journalist in the UK?" (interview), British Council, 8 July 2019.
 Nadine White, "Windrush Stories", Apple Podcasts.

Living people
1992 births
21st-century British journalists
Alumni of University College London
Black British journalists
British investigative journalists
British journalists
British women journalists
English people of Jamaican descent
HuffPost writers and columnists
The Independent people
People from Brixton
People associated with Birmingham City University